Alice May Brock (born February 28, 1941) is an American artist, occasional author and former restaurateur. A resident of Massachusetts for her entire adult life, Brock owned and operated three restaurants in the Berkshires—The Back Room, Take-Out Alice and Alice's at Avaloch—in succession between 1965 and 1979. The first of these served as the inspiration for Arlo Guthrie's song "Alice's Restaurant", which in turn inspired a 1969 film of the same name.

Early life
 Brock was born Alice May Pelkey in Brooklyn, New York City, to a Jewish mother and a Gentile father. The Pelkey family was relatively well-to-do and often spent summers in Provincetown, Massachusetts, where Mr. Pelkey sold artwork for Peter Hunt. Neither of her parents were religious, though her mother was culturally Jewish and she herself identifies as a Jew; she later described her family life as dysfunctional and her father as abusive, noting she still loved her parents but found them difficult to please. After a stint in reform school, she attended Sarah Lawrence College. Brock described herself as politically active as early as her teen years.

After graduating college, she spent a short period of time in Greenwich Village, where in 1962, she met, then married Ray Brock, a woodworker, shop teacher, and real estate flipper from Virginia who was in his mid-30s at the time, over a decade older than Alice. By 1964, they had found work together at the Stockbridge School in Stockbridge, Massachusetts, with Ray working as a shop teacher and Alice as a librarian. With a loan from her mother, they purchased a deconsecrated church in Great Barrington, which the couple converted into a residence for themselves and a gathering place for friends and like-minded bohemians. She would later describe the choice of a church for the group as a form of sacrilege, using a symbol of tradition and established religion to further her counterculture values. In 1991, the long-neglected building was restored and transformed into The Guthrie Center at Old Trinity Church, an interfaith worship center and performance venue.

Littering incident
One of the Brocks' students at the Stockbridge School had been Arlo Guthrie, at the time an aspiring forester, a half-Jewish New York transplant like Brock, and the son of then-ailing folk icon Woody Guthrie. When Arlo Guthrie left Rocky Mountain College in Montana for Thanksgiving break in November 1965, he stayed at the Brocks' residence for their annual Thanksgiving dinner. As a favor to the couple, Guthrie and his friend Richard Robbins agreed to dispose of the large amount of garbage that had accumulated in the church, not realizing that the local dump was closed for the holiday. Guthrie and his friend dumped their load over a cliff on private property. When Stockbridge chief of police William "Obie" Obanhein was made aware of the illegal dumping, he arrested Guthrie and his friend, and held them in the town jail. Alice bailed them out several hours later; her anger at the incident nearly prompted Obanhein to arrest her as well. (Brock was otherwise friendly with Obanhein, considering him "a very sweet man, and (...) a very good cop.") In the end, Guthrie and Robbins were levied a small fine and picked up the garbage that weekend.

First restaurant

Brock was persuaded to open a restaurant by her mother, who saw the purchase as an opportunity for her daughter to become financially independent. She had already been doing a significant amount of cooking and housekeeping for her friends  at the church, which frustrated her. Alice purchased an empty business space in the back of a row of stores on US 7 in Stockbridge and converted it into The Back Room in 1965, shortly before the Guthrie visit. There is some dispute over exactly when The Back Room opened; Brock would claim in 2008 that it was not until after the littering incident, but Guthrie's song about it implies the restaurant was already open by that time. At a jam session Guthrie had with the Brocks during his visit, he, Ray and Alice began formulating the basis for what would become the first half of "Alice's Restaurant". (The second half of the song would come later.)

Brock would reflect on this restaurant's opening as the start of strained relations between her and her husband. According to her, because she was now living her life as an independent woman and needed her own transportation to work the restaurant, Ray no longer had financial control over her—prior to this he had only allotted her a small allowance—which increased tension between the two. Alice also admitted to not knowing much about either cooking at a professional level or business. Contrary to an implication made in the film about The Back Room, Alice says that she was faithful to Ray throughout the marriage and was not promiscuous; she did not sleep with Guthrie, for example. Guthrie also asserts that Alice was faithful to Ray in the final chorus of the song, noting a customer could "get anything you want...excepting Alice" at the restaurant, and his co-defendant, Richard Robbins, described the notion of Alice having affairs as being "complete bull."

Brock closed the restaurant in April 1966 and moved to the Boston area with friends. She would return to Great Barrington and reconcile with Ray shortly thereafter, complete with a large hippie wedding that was written into the film, but the two would divorce permanently in 1968. Ray returned to his home state of Virginia and died of a heart attack in 1979. Alice had no children with him, nor has she ever remarried, commenting in 2020 that she had a dim view of the nuclear family because very few of those she knew had healthy, close-knit family lives.

Film
Brock agreed to participate in the production of the film Alice's Restaurant, including taking part in promotions and making cameo appearances in the film itself; unlike Guthrie and many other figures in the story, she declined an offer to portray herself in the film, and actress Pat Quinn played the role of Alice. Brock earned almost nothing from her promotional work and was dismayed after learning that Arthur Penn, the film's director and co-writer, inserted fictional material into the story that she felt "misrepresented me, embarrassed me, and made me into an object." She objected that "I wasn't sleeping with everybody in the world, for example—and not Arlo Guthrie! And I didn't know anybody who shot heroin." Additionally, the surprise success of the song and the film made Brock an unwilling celebrity. She specifically cited the film as the source of her unwanted fame and stated in hindsight shortly after it was released that she should have done everything in her power to prevent the film from being produced. As of June 1970, she was living alone in a rented house in Lenox, Massachusetts, with plans to stay there long-term.

As a way to compensate Brock, one of the film's producers arranged for her to write a cookbook, The Alice's Restaurant Cookbook, published in 1969. Brock later admitted that many of the featured recipes were created by her and her mother specifically for the book, rather than having originated at the restaurant, and had not been tested before being published; she has made it a life philosophy to frequently experiment with new recipes. The book proved to be a moderate success and went through four printings.

Proposed restaurants 
Brock attempted to start an Alice's Restaurant franchise in the late 1960s, but closed the first location in New York almost immediately due to the quality of its food, which she deemed "abominable". Brock also attempted to open another restaurant in partnership with Joan Woodruff in Lenox, Massachusetts. By June 1970, officials in Lenox had rejected the proposal, fearing that the fame behind the name would draw excessive numbers of hippies and disturb the peace. Brock—who blamed the film's portrayal of her for the town's decision while empathizing with their stance—pulled out, giving her menus and share in the proposed restaurant to Woodruff.

Second restaurant
The proceeds from the film and book sales (which netted $12,000 for her), coupled with her decision to sell the church in 1971, freed up Brock's financial situation enough that she bought a former liquor store on Route 183 in Housatonic and converted it into Take-Out Alice, a walk-up food stand that, according to her, operated on the principle of serving "slow food, cooked fast". Take-Out Alice was considered to be Brock's best and most well-received food service operation. After battling with town officials, in 1973 she was able to install seats in the facility, which she then renamed Alice's Restaurant in an effort to capitalize on her fame.

Third restaurant
As the popularity of the restaurant outgrew its location and Brock was unable to secure a liquor license in Housatonic, she expanded into a much larger operation and bought an estate in Lenox, which she converted into her third and final restaurant, Alice's at Avaloch, in 1976. In contrast to her smaller, more intimate operations at the previous two restaurants, Alice's at Avaloch boasted a disco floor, swimming pool and a performance venue in addition to greatly increased seating. The location proved to be a major headache for Brock, as its infrastructure was not well-suited to an operation as large as the one she was running, at one point a severe snowstorm hit in the middle of spring, and she again ran afoul of local town officials. As was typical of her life philosophy, she often used the restaurant for charitable purposes, offering jobs to those in need. She closed the restaurant in 1979, allowing her lenders to foreclose upon the property. The loss of the property left her "bankrupt and shellshocked."

Retirement
Brock never intended to pursue a career in the restaurant business and always expressed more interest in art. She did a few printings for an exhibition shortly before leaving the Berkshires, and all of them sold, further encouraging her to pursue it more seriously. After the closure of Alice's at Avaloch, she relocated to Provincetown, where she set up an art studio. She spent most of the 1980s as a prep cook for various restaurants in Provincetown before leaving full-time work in part because of a diagnosis of emphysema in the 1990s. A chronic cigarette smoker of up to three packs a day, she visited hypnotist Yefim Shubentsov in 1991, who cured her of her addiction.

In 2014, Brock made a one-time appearance at the Dream Away Lodge in Becket, Massachusetts, where she and other chefs inspired by her prepared some of her old recipes. Brock's personal favorite medium is rock art, a medium that she practiced most of her adult life; she was an active and early participant in The Kindness Rock Project, in which she painted rocks and encouraged people to hide them in unusual places to be found and relocated. Her home art gallery was located on Commercial Street overlooking Cape Cod. She continues to return to the Berkshires each Thanksgiving and host a dinner with her friends. Her 2022 dinner was hosted at the home of Richard Robbins, who had helped Guthrie dispose Brock's garbage in 1965 and still lives in Housatonic; Guthrie visited the dinner, reuniting the three for their first Thanksgiving dinner together in 57 years.

In addition to the Cookbook, Brock has also authored two other books: her 1976 autobiography My Life as a Restaurant and a children's book, How to Massage Your Cat. She also illustrated another children's book, Mooses Come Walking, written by Arlo Guthrie.

Brock initially bristled at the fame that the song and film had brought upon her but later came to appreciate her role as an icon of the 1960s. Her current stance on her fame is that she neither openly advertises it nor hides from it; it was not until the 2000s that she became comfortable being associated with the song. She still resents how the film portrayed her but states that the joy people get when meeting her in person is an honor: "How can you resent that?"

Brock's financial and physical health turned for the worse in the late 2010s. Declining artwork sales forced her to sell her home in 2017, after which she moved in with a friend who died shortly thereafter; worsening chronic obstructive pulmonary disease and heart disease forced her to enter a nursing home for much of 2018, while an essential tremor now prevents her from drawing the artwork that had been her primary source of income. Viki Merrick, a radio producer and former bartender at Alice's at Avaloch, serves as Brock's caretaker as of 2020. Dini Lamot and other friends in the music and arts communities organized fundraisers for her, in appreciation of her many years of support for local artists, musicians and the LGBTQ community, so that she can afford the approximately $60,000 per year she would need to remain in Provincetown. NPR reported on Brock's medical and financial problems in a feature on Thanksgiving Day 2020, prompting a flood of $125,000 in donations to the fundraiser. That same year, Brock recorded a custom series of introductions to "Alice's Restaurant" for stations that regularly play the song on Thanksgiving.

Imitators 
The Alice's Restaurant of Sky Londa, California has no association with Alice Brock. It was founded by Alice Taylor at the same time Brock opened up The Back Room, then converted into a tourist trap by subsequent owners capitalizing on the similarity in name (eventually adding a "Group W bench" in homage to the Guthrie song).

References

External links

People from Brooklyn
People from Provincetown, Massachusetts
Living people
1941 births
20th-century American artists
American women restaurateurs
American restaurateurs
Sarah Lawrence College alumni
American cookbook writers
Women cookbook writers
Jewish American chefs
Jewish American artists
Artists from Massachusetts
Writers from Massachusetts
Writers from Brooklyn
Artists from Brooklyn
American autobiographers